Lady C may refer to:
 Lady Colin Campbell, also known as Lady C, British author, socialite and television personality
 Lady C (wrestler), Japanese professional wrestler